Georgy Georgievich Sarkisyants (March 16, 1934, Moscow – May 5, 2011, Moscow ) was a  Soviet and Russian sports journalist and TV commentator, best known for the television show Football Review, a  television and radio commentary of the largest sporting events.

Biography 
He studied at the Moscow State Institute, after the merger of the Institute of Oriental Studies of MGIMO and in 1954 moved to the Leningrad State University, Department of Journalism at the Faculty of Philology. In the USSR Radio and Television since 1959.

The commentator, who led the coverage of boxing, football, figure skating. In 1960, for the first time as a commentator held in the air parade dedicated to the Day of the Soviet athlete.

Conducted thematic review program Vremya, the transfer of   Goals, Points, Seconds and  Football Review. Commented 15 events of the Olympic Games, 30 world championships and European football, and boxing competitions, weightlifting, biathlon and figure skating. He became the first sports commentator, who received the title of Honored Worker of Culture of Russia. 

In his final years he worked as a television commentator on the channel Eurosport-Russia.

References

External links
 
 
Георгий Саркисьянц. Биографическая справка

1934 births
2011 deaths
Saint Petersburg State University alumni
Soviet sports journalists
Russian sports journalists
Russian association football commentators
Soviet television presenters
Russian television presenters
Figure skating commentators
Burials at Novodevichy Cemetery
Russian people of Armenian descent